The Umvoti Mounted Rifles (named after the Umvoti River) is an armoured regiment of the South African Army. As a reserve unit, it has a status roughly equivalent to that of a British Army Reserve or United States Army National Guard unit. It is part of the South African Army Armour Formation and is based in the town of Pinetown.

History

Origin
On 16 May 1864,  years ago, the Umvoti Mounted Rifles (UMR) was founded in Greytown as the Greytown Mounted Rifles. There were some 45 men in the original unit, under command of Capt A.S. Wyndham who was also the Magistrate of Greytown at the time.

The Umvoti Mounted Rifles Hall is the oldest hall in Greytown. It was built in 1880 as a Masonic Hall, but later became the headquarters of the Regiment. It is currently used by the Greytown public works department.

The Umvoti Mounted Rifles was formed in 1893 at Greytown, Natal by the redesignation of the left Wing of the Natal Carbineers. On 1 July 1913 the Regiment absorbed the Zululand Mounted Rifles, was redesignated the 4th Mounted Rifles (Umvoti Mounted Rifles) and transferred to the Active Citizen Force of the Union Defence Force. In 1934 the Regiment was redesignated as the Umvoti Mounted Rifles and converted to infantry.

Engagements and Wars
The Natal Mounted Rifles served in the Second Anglo-Boer War (1899–1902), the Zulu Rebellion (1906–1907), World War I (specifically in South-West Africa from 1914 to 1915), World War II and South Africa's post-war internal conflicts and "Border War".

Various musterings
The UMR since 1920 served under command of the OC, Natal Command as firstly a Mounted Regiment on horseback and then, from 1935 as a motorised infantry unit. In September 1939 they were part of the 1st South African Brigade of the Natal Command. During the Second World War the Regiment served as an Infantry unit and in 1954 was converted to a Tank Regiment and subsequently in 1962 into an armoured car regiment.

Affiliation with 8th Armoured Division
During 1984 the UMR was brigaded as the Armoured Car Regiment of 8th South African Armoured Division 84 Motorised Brigade. This necessitated conversion from a county-insurgency unit to a conventional force and ended 74 years service with Natal Command. The unit was then the Armoured Car Reconnaissance regiment of 8 SA Division and was then part of 84 SA Brigade based in Durban, Natal.

Regimental Colours
In 1866 the first Regimental Colours of blue silk were presented to the Grey-town Mounted Rifles. In 1901 the regiment was again honoured by the presentation of colours by two Greytown ladies.
In 1904 HRH Princess Helena, third daughter of Queen Victoria, presented the King's Colours to UMR. These have been consecrated and are housed in St James Church in Greytown for safekeeping. In 1964 the latest presentation of the Colours took place during the regiment's 100th birthday celebrations by Commandant-General P H Grobbelaar and incorporates the regimental badge in gold on a blue background which signi¬fies an armoured regiment.

National Colours
On 14 July 1990, National Colours were presented to the Regiment by Major General D J Mortimer.

Under the SANDF
In 1999, 84 SA Brigade was closed and the unit then fell under direct command of the South African Army Armoured Formation, and Umvoti Mounted Rifles was transferred to the new armoured 'type' formation, the South African Army Armoured Formation. The Regiment currently uses the Rooikat armoured fighting vehicle, equipped with a 76 mm quick-fire gun.

In 2012 the long-awaited new history of the regiment, written by historian Mark Coghlan, was published by Just Done Productions Publishing.

Insignia

Previous dress insignia

Leadership

Freedom of entry
 Greytown
 Melmoth
 Empangeni
 Eshowe
 Pinetown
 Pietermaritzburg
 Ladysmith

Alliances
 - The Queen's Royal Hussars (The Queen's Own and Royal Irish)

Battle honours
South Africa 1879, South Africa 1899–1902, Relief of Ladysmith, Natal 1906, South West Africa 1914–1915, Gibeon, Western Desert 1941–43

As virtually the whole Regiment was captured at Tobruk in June 1942, there were no more World War II battle honours.

References

Notes

Armoured regiments of South Africa
Military units and formations in Durban
Military units and formations of South Africa in World War I
Military units and formations of South Africa in the Border War
Military units and formations established in 1864